The 2021–22 Tennessee Volunteers basketball team represented the University of Tennessee during the 2021–22 NCAA Division I men's basketball season. The team is led by seventh-year head coach Rick Barnes, and plays their home games at Thompson–Boling Arena in Knoxville, Tennessee as a member of the Southeastern Conference.  They finished the season 27–8, 14–4 in SEC play to finish in a tie for second place. As the No. 2 seed in the SEC tournament, they defeated Mississippi State, Kentucky and Texas A&M to win their first SEC Tournament title since 1979. They received the conference's automatic bid to the NCAA tournament as the No. 3 seed in the South Region, where they defeated Longwood in the First Round before being upset by Michigan in the Second Round.

Previous season 
The Volunteers finished the 2020–21 season 18–9, 10–7 in SEC play to finish in fourth place. They defeated Florida in the quarterfinals of the SEC tournament before losing to Alabama in the semifinals. They received an at-large bid to the NCAA tournament as a 5th seed in the Midwest Region where they got upset by Oregon State in the first round.

Offseason

Departures

Incoming Transfers

2021 recruiting class

2022 recruiting class

Roster

Schedule and results

|-
!colspan=12 style=| Exhibition

|-
!colspan=12 style=| Regular season

|-
!colspan=12 style=| SEC Tournament

|-
!colspan=12 style=| NCAA tournament

Source

Rankings

*Coaches did not release a week 1 poll.

See also
2021–22 Tennessee Lady Volunteers basketball team

References

Tennessee Volunteers basketball seasons
Tennessee Volunteers
Volunteers basketball
Volunteers basketball
Tennessee